The Chaperone is a 2018 period drama film, directed by Michael Engler, with a screenplay by Julian Fellowes, from the novel by Laura Moriarty. It stars Elizabeth McGovern, Haley Lu Richardson, Miranda Otto,  Blythe Danner, Campbell Scott, Géza Röhrig and Victoria Hill.

It had its world premiere at the Los Angeles Film Festival on September 23, 2018. It was released on March 29, 2019, by PBS Distribution.

Plot 
The story centers on Norma Carlisle, a middle-aged woman who chaperones the teenage Louise Brooks, who ventures to New York City to study dance at the Denishawn school.

Cast
 Elizabeth McGovern as Norma (The Chaperone)
 Haley Lu Richardson as Louise Brooks
 Miranda Otto as Ruth St. Denis
 Blythe Danner as Mary O'Dell
 Campbell Scott as Alan Carlisle
 Géza Röhrig as Joseph
 Victoria Hill as Myra Brooks
 Matt McGrath as Raymond
 Robert Fairchild as Ted Shawn
 Tyler Weaks as Howard Carlisle
 Kate Grimes as Ms. Burton
 Andrew Burnap as Floyd
 Bill Hoag as Jack
 Ellen Toland as Greta
 George Hampe as Earl Carlisle
 Sean Hudock as Norman Ross
 Vinson German as Music Hall Man
 Becky Ann Baker as Lois

Production
In February 2013, it was announced Elizabeth McGovern would star in the film, with Simon Curtis directing from a screenplay by Julian Fellowes, based upon the novel by Laura Moriarty, with McGovern, Curtis, Eli Selden, and Adam Shulman producing under their Anonymous Content banner. Fox Searchlight Pictures would distribute the film. In May 2017, it was announced Michael Engler would direct the film, instead of Curtis, who remained as executive producer on the film. Masterpiece, Altus Media, and Rose Pictures produced the film, with PBS Distribution distributing it. The film received a theatrical release prior to airing on PBS. Victoria Hill, Greg Clark, Luca Scalisi, Rose Ganguzza, Kelly Carmichael and Gary Hamilton also served as producers on the film.

Filming
Principal photography began in August 2017.

Release
The film had its world premiere at the Los Angeles Film Festival on September 23, 2018. It was released on March 29, 2019.

Critical reception
The site's critical consensus reads, "The Chaperone is inspired by a potentially interesting real-life story, but loses its sharpest and timeliest angles in the telling." On Metacritic, the film holds a rating of 48 out of 100, based on 14 critics, indicating "mixed or average reviews".

References

External links
 
 
 
 

2018 films
American drama films
2018 drama films
Films set in the 20th century
Films based on American novels
Films scored by Marcelo Zarvos
2010s English-language films
2010s American films